Child Life could refer to:

 Child Life (magazine), an American children's magazine begun in 1922
 Child Life (journal), an academic journal published by the Froebel Society between 1931 and 1939
  Child life specialist, pediatric health care professionals
 Child life (degree), the field of study of child life specialists
  Child Life Insurance
 Chase Child Life Program